East Carolina University (ECU) is a public research university in Greenville, North Carolina. It is the fourth largest university in North Carolina.

Founded on March 8, 1907, as a teacher training school, East Carolina has grown from its original  to almost  today. The university's academic facilities are located on six properties: Main Campus, Health Sciences Campus, West Research Campus, the Field Station for Coastal Studies in New Holland, North Carolina, the Millennial Research Innovation Campus in Greenville's warehouse district and an overseas campus in Certaldo Alto, Italy. ECU also operates the Coastal Studies Institute. The nine undergraduate colleges, graduate school, and four professional schools are located on these four properties. All of the non-health sciences majors are located on the main campus. The College of Nursing, College of Allied Health Sciences, The Brody School of Medicine, and School of Dental Medicine are located on the health science campus.  ECU is classified among "R2: Doctoral Universities – High research activity".

There are eleven social sororities, 16 social fraternities, four historically black sororities, five historically black fraternities, one Native American fraternity, and one Native American sorority. There are over 400 registered clubs on campus including fraternities and sororities.

History

On March 8, 1907, East Carolina Teachers Training School (ECTTS) was officially chartered by the North Carolina General Assembly through the passing of legislation Public Laws of North Carolina, 1907, Chapter 820 titled An Act to Stimulate High School Instruction in the Public Schools of the State and Teacher Training. The chairman of its original Board of Trustees, Thomas Jordan Jarvis, a former Governor of North Carolina now known as the "Father of ECU", participated in groundbreaking ceremonies for the first buildings on July 2, 1908, in Greenville, North Carolina, and ECTTS opened its doors on October 5, 1909. Although its purpose was to train "young white men and women", there were no male graduates until 1932. In 1920, ECTTS became a four–year institution and renamed East Carolina Teachers College; its first bachelor's degrees were awarded the following year in education. A master's degree program was authorized in 1929; the first such degree granted by the college was in 1933. Progress toward full college status was made in 1948 with the designation of the Bachelor of Arts as a liberal arts degree, and the Bachelor of Science as a teaching degree. A change of name to East Carolina College in 1951 reflected this expanded mission. Over the objections of Governor Dan K. Moore, who opposed the creation of a university system separate from the Consolidated University of North Carolina, ECC was made a regional university effective July 1, 1967, and assumed its present name, East Carolina University. The university did not remain independent for long; on July 1, 1972, it was incorporated into the University of North Carolina System, the successor to the Consolidated University. Today, ECU is the fourth–largest university in North Carolina with  undergraduate and  graduate students, including the 344 medicine and 206 dental students.

Campus

East Carolina is separated into three distinct campuses: Main Campus, Health Sciences Campus, and West Research Campus. It owns two sports complexes: Blount Recreational Sports Complex and North Recreational Complex. It owns a field station in New Holland, North Carolina.

Main
The 158 buildings on main campus comprise more than 4.6 million square feet (325,000 m2) of academic, research, and residential space. Many of the Main Campus buildings feature the Spanish–Mission style architecture; inspiration drawn from Thomas Jarvis' time as an ambassador to Brazil. He wanted to bring the unique architecture to eastern North Carolina. On the main campus, there are five districts: Campus Core, Downtown District, Warehouse District, Athletic fields and the South Academic District. On the Campus Core, there are 15 residence halls which are divided into three separate neighborhoods. The distinct feature of the main campus is the mall, which is a large tree–laden grassy area where many students go to relax. In the middle of the mall is the replica of the cupola on the original Austin building.

Athletic fields
The varsity athletics fields are located south of the College Hill residential neighborhood. Fourteenth Street divides College Hill to the north, with the athletic fields to the south. Charles Boulevard borders the fields to the west and Greenville Boulevard borders it to the south. A residential neighborhood and Elmhurst Elementary School are the eastern borders. The northern portion of the area sits Dowdy–Ficklen Stadium, Minges Coliseum, and Minges Natatorium, along with parking. The Murphy Center, which is the primary strength and conditioning, and banquet building, is located between Dowdy-Ficklen and Minges Coliseum. The Ward Sports Medicine Building, Scales Field House, and the Pirate Club Building also surround Dowdy-Ficklen. The Ward Sports Medicine Building houses offices for football, Pirate Club, and athletic administration. The Scales Field House provides locker rooms, additional athletic department offices for marketing and event operations, and classroom space for ECU's athletic training program. South of those facilities is the Cliff Moore Practice Facility which has a pair of natural grass fields and one FieldTurf field designed exclusively for the football team. On the southern border of the practice facility is Clark-LeClair Stadium, which is the men's baseball stadium. It opened in 2005 and seats 3,000 in permanent seating with another 2,000 located in the outfield. At the southern end of the fields is the Olympic Sports Complex, which include women's soccer stadium, softball stadium, track and field facility, and Olympic Sports Team building. The Olympic Sports Complex was completed in 2011 with a price of $23.4 million. The Smith-Williams Center is a $17 million basketball development and practice facility, opened in 2013. The football stadium is planning for a $40 million upgrade. The upgrades will include a new press, club, and suite areas, and upper deck, all located on the south side. This addition will increase the capacity from 50,000 to 60,000.

East Carolina has spent $92 million on athletic projects from 1998 to 2011. Including the proposed projects, this is increased to $145 million.

Health Sciences
The Health Sciences campus prepares health care practitioners across a full range of professions, including nurses, dentists, physical therapists, speech therapists, physicians, and more. Many graduates of ECU health sciences remain in the underserved East Carolina region to provide care in the area. It is situated beside Vidant Medical Center (VMC). VMC was originally Pitt County Memorial Hospital. After becoming a private non-profit hospital, the renaming occurred. VMC, an 861–bed flagship Level I Trauma Center, serves as the academic medical center for The Brody School of Medicine. Vidant Health owns VMC, leases or owns six and manages one. Other buildings besides VMC include Brody Medicine Science Building, the East Carolina Heart Institute, Leo Jenkins Cancer Center, and the Allied Health building composed of the College of Nursing, Laupus Medical Library and College of Allied Health Sciences. The  Family Medicine Center opened in the fall of 2011. Ross Hall, which houses the School of Dental Medicine, is just under 200,000 square feet.

West Research
Approximately  are designated wetlands and large areas of biology, botany and other sciences field study sites. It has an environmental health onsite wastewater demonstration facility which is open to the public and all educators. It is also the home of the North Carolina Institute for Health and Safety in Agriculture, Forestry, and Fisheries with an administrative and several support buildings.

Institutes and centers
 The Brody School of Medicine at East Carolina University
East Carolina University School of Dental Medicine
 East Carolina Heart Institute
 Leo W. Jenkins Cancer Center
 Innovation Design Lab
 Family Medicine Center
 Coastal Studies Institute
 Center for Epidemiology and Outcomes Research
 Small Business Institute
 Institute for Coastal Science and Policy
 Pediatric Healthy Weight Research and Treatment Center
 Center for Sustainable Tourism
 Center for Sustainability
 Center for Natural Hazards
 Center for Geographic Information Science
 Center for GIScience
 Center for Applied Computational Studies
 Center for Science, Technology, Engineering and Mathematics Education
 Center for Survey Research
 Lost Colony Center for Science & Research
 East Carolina Diabetes and Obesity Institute
 Pocosin Arts Riverside Lodge
 NC Agromedicine Institute
 Golden LEAF Educational Consortium

Community Service Learning Centers
The School of Dental Medicine built 8 community service learning centers located in rural and underserved areas throughout the state of North Carolina. The fourth-year students learn and provide care for the community for one year in these community centers. All 8 community centers are currently active. They are located in Ahoskie, Elizabeth City, Lillington, Spruce Pine, Bolivia, Thomasville, Lumberton, and Sylva.

Field Station for Coastal Studies
The field station is located in New Holland, North Carolina. The area serves as a field station for the coastal studies, coastal resource management, and biology programs. The main goal of the field station is economic development into the region through both environmental education and eco–tourism. It also serves as a facility for small retreats and as a base for research on coastal issues. 
It was listed on the National Register of Historic Places in 1980. It is adjacent to the  Mattamuskeet Wildlife Refuge.

North Recreational Complex
North Recreational Complex (NRC) is an athletic complex located on a  parcel of land north of East Carolina University's main campus. The NRC is one of the Nation's largest recreational complexes. It will augment the Blount Intramural Sports Fields located behind the Carol Belk Building on Charles Boulevard. The first of three phases of the complex opened on September 2, 2008. Phase one includes eight lighted fields, a  lake with a beach, walking trails/areas, and a field house. The complex is located near the intersection of the North Carolina Highway 33 and U.S. Route 264.

Phase II opened in August 2011, with the grand opening occurring on September 15, 2011. This phase includes a  lake on with a  beach. A  boat house is also located there. Canoes, kayaks and stand-up paddleboards can be rented at the boathouse for use in the lake. Other amenities include sand volleyball courts, horseshoes, grills, fitness equipment, six walking/running trails, a disc golf course, and an Odyssey Course which includes a 300-foot zip line.

UNC Coastal Studies Institute
Main page: University of North Carolina - Coastal Studies Institute

ECU houses and manages the UNC Coastal Studies Institute (UNC-CSI) which is an inter-university, marine research institute located on Roanoke Island in Manteo along the Croatan Sound on the Outer Banks, established in 2003 focusing on Estuarine Ecology and Human Health, Coastal Processes and Engineering, Public Policy and Coastal Sustainability, and Maritime Heritage.

Colleges and schools

ECU is home to nine undergraduate colleges, a graduate school, and four professional schools. The oldest school is the modern day College of Education. The university offers 16 doctoral degree programs, 4 first professional degree programs, 76 master's degree programs, and 102 bachelor's degree programs.

ECU's liberal arts college is the Thomas Harriot College of Arts and Sciences. It consists of 16 departments, making it the third largest College. The liberal arts college has its roots in the beginning of the university.

The College of Business is a professional school consisting of six departments with undergraduate concentrations in each, plus the Miller School of Entrepreneurship and a Master of Business Administration and Master of Science in Accounting program. The college's beginnings came in 1936 when the Department of Commerce was organized. It later changed to the Department of Business Education, and then to the Department of Business. Finally, in 1960, the School of Business was formed. The college undergraduate program was accredited in 1967, and the graduate program was accredited in 1976 by The Association to Advance Collegiate Schools of Business. The college is a governing school of the Graduate Management Admission Council. The college runs a Small Business Institute to advise small business owners on how to succeed.

The College of Education is the oldest and largest college at ECU. It houses and administers all of the education majors and an international open access journal, the Journal of Curriculum and Instruction. There are 17 undergraduate degree programs, 22 graduate degree programs, six advanced certifications, and the Doctor of Education program. The college prepares more professionals for North Carolina schools than any other university in the state. The college scored higher than other North Carolina universities when the state board evaluated teacher education programs in 2006. In addition, the Institution of Higher Education Performance Report showed ECU was first in the number of graduates who were employed in public schools across the state. The college is considered one of the exemplary professional preparation programs according to the North Carolina State Board of Education's Higher Education Performance Report.

The College of Fine Arts and Communication comprises four schools that range from dance to design and broadcast journalism. The college officially opened on July 1, 2003, but can trace its roots to ECU founding; the school hired art and music professionals in 1907 to train teachers.

The College of Health and Human Performance is made up of eight academic units and handles all of the recreational and exercise degrees at East Carolina University. It took on its name in 2003, but traces its legacy to the Department of Physical Education in 1930. It was the 1930 East Carolina Teachers College Planning Document number two priority. In 1938, the Department of Physical Education was established and Physical education became a specialty area for high school teachers.

The College of Engineering and Technology comprises four departments. The college offers nine degrees including engineering, computer science, construction management, design, distribution and logistics, industrial engineering technology, information and computer technology, and industrial technology.

The College of Allied Health Sciences offers 25 degree and certificate programs in health science disciplines primarily associated with health maintenance and rehabilitative services. The college comprises nine departments: Addictions and Rehabilitation Studies (addiction, clinical, and mental health counseling), Biostatistics, Clinical Laboratory Sciences, Communication Sciences and Disorders (Audiology and Speech-Language Pathology), Health Services and Information Management, Nutrition Science, Occupational Therapy, Physical Therapy, and Physician Assistant Studies. Bachelor of Science, Master of Science, Doctor of Audiology, Doctor of Physical Therapy, and PhD degrees are offered. Established in the 1967–68 school year as the School of Allied Health and Social Professions, the College of Allied Health Sciences is now located in the Allied Health Sciences building on the Health Sciences Campus and is the largest allied health college in the state.

The College of Nursing is a professional school that offers one undergraduate degree, Bachelor of Science in Nursing. The school was created in 1959 and now offers Bachelor of Science, Masters, and Ph.D programs. The college has over 100 faculty teaching the students everything about the nursing field while practicing in the under-served Eastern North Carolina. There are three departments within this school: Department of Undergraduate Nursing Science Junior Division, Department of Undergraduate Nursing Science Senior Division, and the Department of Graduate Nursing Science. On October 12, 2007, the University of North Carolina Board of Governors permitted the re–designation of the School of Nursing to the College of Nursing. The National League for Nursing named the college a Center of Excellence. The college produces more nurses than any other school in the Mid-Atlantic region.

The Graduate School consist of 85 master's degree, 21 doctoral programs and 62 certificates. It coordinates the graduate offerings of all departments in the nine colleges. The School also runs the non–professional degree programs of the professional School of Medicine. The school offers 17 master's degree in 
Accounting, Arts, Business Administration, 
Construction Management, Education, Environmental Health, Fine Arts, Library Science, Music, Nursing, Occupational Therapy, Public Administration, Public Health, School AdministrationScience, Social Work and Teaching. It also offers four doctoral degrees in Audiology, Education, Philosophy, and Physical Therapy.

The Brody School of Medicine is a professional school at the university. It consists of seven graduate majors, plus the Doctor of Medicine, all located on the Health Sciences Campus. The first appropriations were approved in 1974, with the first medical students arriving in 1977. The medical school is one of five in North Carolina.

The School of Dental Medicine is a professional school at the university. The school graduates one degree, Doctor of Dental Medicine. It also has three residencies in Advanced Education in General Dentistry and Dental General Practice. The school also offers a specialty program in Pedodontics. It was founded on February 24, 2006, at the East Carolina Board of Trustees meeting. The dental school was unanimously approved by the UNC System Board of Governors as well. The facilities are located on the Health Sciences Campus and will house the first three years of education. Dental students will complete their final year at ECU Community Service Learning Centers to be located throughout the state. The School of Dental Medicine is one of two dental schools in the state.

Research
Randolph Chitwood, a cardiothoracic surgeon with East Carolina, performed the first minimally invasive robotic-assisted mitral-valve heart surgery in the United States. East Carolina researchers also developed an electronic fluency device called SpeechEasy; the device is designed to improve the fluency of a person who stutters by changing the sound of the user's voice in his or her ear. Walter Pories, a faculty member at The Brody School of Medicine developed the standard procedure for gastric bypass surgery. Researchers here also first discovered that 80% of obese/type 2 diabetic patients who underwent this surgical procedure had a reversal of the disease. The Biofeedback Lab is currently developing techniques to help service members recover from posttraumatic stress disorders and traumatic brain injuries they received in Afghanistan and Iraq. The in vitro fertilization program is ranked first in North Carolina and fourth overall in the United States. Jason Bond, a former scientist in the Department of Biology, discovered many new species of spiders, including Myrmekiaphila neilyoungi and Aptostichus stephencolberti.

During an archaeological dig on Hatteras Island in 1998, archaeologists discovered a 10-carat gold English signet ring from the 16th century, among other artifacts. The discovered ring was the first material connection between The Lost Colony on Roanoke Island and the Algonquian peoples on Croatan Island. In 2011, underwater archaeologists raised the anchors of the Queen Anne's Revenge, the flagship vessel of Blackbeard, near Beaufort.

Libraries

J.Y. Joyner Library is the main library located beside the Mall on the main campus. It holds nearly 1.9 million bound volumes, 2.1 million pieces of microform, 532,000 government documents, and more than 24,000 journal subscriptions. The library, which houses the East Carolina manuscript collection, is the largest library east of Raleigh. It is one of the leading repositories in the nation for modern naval and maritime history. It also holds materials related to North Carolina, the tobacco industry, worldwide missionary activities, and American military history. The library is the official repository of the records of the United States Coast Guard Auxiliary. The J. Edgar Hoover Collection on International Communism contains many items dealing with communism worldwide. The Rare Book Collections has items dating from 1589, including a 1733 Edward Moseley map, the first to comprehensively map the colony of North Carolina and the only original copy in the United States.

The Music Library is a branch of Joyner Library located on the first floor of A.J. Fletcher Music Center. It houses approximately 93,000 items, including the entire audio recording collection. It is the largest music collection east of Raleigh. The primary users of the library are faculty and students within the School of Music and the School of Theatre and Dance, but anyone can use its resources. It began in the 1958–59 academic year when a small library was created. Today a staff of five oversee the library duties.

The William E. Laupus Library is the medical and health library for East Carolina. It is the primary library for the Brody School of Medicine, the College of Nursing, the College of Allied Health Sciences, and the School of Dental Medicine. It holds approximately 160,000 volumes (print and non–print) and 10,000 current print, non–print, and electronic serial titles. In 2006, it moved to the Health Sciences Building on the Health Sciences campus. The library is named for Dr. Laupus, a former Dean of Brody School of Medicine.

Student life

Student Government Association
The Student Government Association at East Carolina University serves the student voice and represents student concerns to a variety of sources including campus administration and other departments.

Greek life

There are ten social sororities at the East Carolina Campus, most of which own a house located at or near 5th or 10th Street. There are currently 18 social fraternities at East Carolina. The majority are located off or near 5th Street or 10th Street. Of the 18 social fraternities, seven currently do own a house. Greek life started in 1958 with the introduction of four social fraternities: With the first being Kappa Alpha Order. Later came Beta Theta Pi, Pi Lambda Phi, Pi Kappa Alpha, and Theta Chi. Two years later, eight of the ten social sororities were founded.

National Pan-Hellenic Council (NPHC) has a presence on campus, as well. There are four historically African American sororities and five historically African American fraternities. There are over 18 honor and 13 service or religious fraternities or sororities at ECU.

Athletics

ECU's sports teams, nicknamed the Pirates, compete in NCAA Division FBS as a full–member of the American Athletic Conference (The American). The Pirates joined The American on July 1, 2014. Jon Gilbert is the current athletic director. The football team is supported by world-class spirit groups, such as the East Carolina University Marching Pirates, National Award-winning Cheerleading squads, and spirit teams. Facilities include the 50,000-seat Dowdy–Ficklen Stadium for football, the 8,000-seat Williams Arena at Minges Coliseum for men's and women's basketball, and Clark-LeClair Stadium, with a seating capacity of 3,000 (max capacity of 6,000+ when including outfield "Jungle" areas) for baseball. The Ward Sports Medicine building comprises  and houses the athletic department, Pirate Club offices and the Human Performance Laboratory. Athletes train in the Murphy Center a  edifice, housing the strength and conditioning facilities, along with banquet rooms, sport memorabilia, and an academic enhancement center. The Murphy Center was built for approximately $13 million and opened its doors to ECU student–athletes in June 2002.

Diversity
The EDC Mini-grant Project-The Office of Equity, Diversity, and Community Relations developed this project to improve East Carolina University's number of diversity studies, programs, and groups. This project intends to supply resources and funds towards diversity proposals offered by students, campus organizations, faculty, and staff. These programs include monitoring cultural awareness educational seminars, to improve departmental climate, to recruit diverse students, for research for curriculum improvement, among others. ECU is also home to many diversity initiatives, including Intercultural Affairs. Intercultural Affairs creates inclusive and equitable communities where all persons confidently know and are known. Under this umbrella is the Center for Leadership and Civic Engagement, the Dr. Jesse R. Peel LGBTQ Center, the Ledonia Wright Cultural Center, Student Veteran Services, and the Women and Gender Office.

Administration

There have been six presidents and seven Chancellors in the university's history. Robert Herring Wright was inaugurated as the first president of ECTTS on November 13, 1909. The chief administrator changed names after ECU joined the UNC System in 1972. The chancellor is chosen by the University of North Carolina Board of Governors on the recommendation of the board's president, and he reports to the 12–member Board of Trustees at ECU. Four of the twelve trustees are picked by the Governor of North Carolina, while the other eight are picked by the Board of Governors. The ECU student body president is an ex officio member of the board of trustees.

Cecil Staton became chancellor in 2016, replacing Steve Ballard. After Staton resigned in 2019, the UNC System named Dan Gerlach as the interim chancellor. In late September 2019, Gerlach was placed on administrative leave after photos and video emerged, showing his interaction with students at a popular bar in the downtown area. UNC System Interim President Bill Roper announced that ECU Provost and Senior Vice Chancellor Ronald Mitchelson will serve as the university's acting chancellor, and Philip Rogers was named the 12th Chancellor in December 2020.

The University of North Carolina Board of Governors is the policy-making body legally charged with "the general determination, control, supervision, management, and governance of all affairs of the constituent institutions". It has 32 voting members who are elected by the General Assembly for four-year terms.

Rankings

In 2016, East Carolina was classified by U.S. News & World Report as a National University in its Top-tier rankings. In 2010, Forbes ranked the school 36th in its America's Best College Buys story. 
 
In the 2012 edition of U.S. News & World Report, The Brody School of Medicine is ranked 10th in the country for primary care physician preparation, 13th in the rural medicine specialty and 14th in family medicine. In 2010, Brody was ranked seventh on the social mission scale.

In 2009, the university was awarded the Patriot Award. The Patriot Award recognizes employers who go above and beyond what the law requires in supporting their employees who serve in the National Guard or reserves. In 2010, the university was awarded the Secretary of Defense Employer Support Freedom Award. It is the highest recognition given by the U.S. Government to employers for their outstanding support of their employees who serve in the Guard and Reserve.

Songs
"Hail to Thy Name So Fair"  is the alma mater at East Carolina University. It first appeared in the 1940–41 East Carolina Teachers College Student Handbook. It was written by Harold A. McDougle ('44) who became a part-time instructor in the Music Department from 1946 to 1947. The Marching Pirates perform the song during all home football and basketball games. At every home football game, after the National Anthem is played by the band, the Alma Mater is played followed by the E.C. Victory song. At the end of football games, the football team walks to the student section to sing the Alma Mater and E.C. Victory song in unison.

Notable alumni

Pirate graduates have been influential in teaching, business, and the arts. Nia Imani Franklin, American composer and beauty pageant titleholder, who graduated in 2015, was crowned Miss New York and Miss America 2019, the first without the swimsuit competition segment. Actress Emily Procter, Beth Grant, and screenwriter Kevin Williamson, creator of Scream and Dawson's Creek, graduated from East Carolina. Acclaimed screen actress Sandra Bullock attended, but graduated later after leaving to pursue her acting career. Marcus Crandell (born June 1, 1974, in Charlotte, North Carolina) is a former quarterback and current coach in professional Canadian football; he played 11 seasons for the Edmonton Eskimos, Calgary Stampeders and Saskatchewan Roughriders from 1997 to 2008 while also spending time in NFL Europe and the XFL. Crandell was named the Grey Cup Most Valuable Player after the Stampeders won the 89th Grey Cup in 2001. Class of 1974 Alumnus Rick Atkinson, wrote An Army at Dawn: The War in North Africa, 1942–1943 followed by "The Day of Battle, The War in Sicily, 1943–1944" and Dan Neil wrote criticism on automobiles; both received Pulitzer Prizes. Ron Clark, a teacher, author, and founder of the Ron Clark Academy in Atlanta, Georgia. 
James Maynard graduated with a degree in psychology and founded the Golden Corral restaurant chain. Kelly King is the current chief executive officer for BB&T and graduated with an undergraduate degree in business accounting and a master's of business administration. Former Jacksonville Jaguars quarterback David Garrard attended where he majored in Construction Management. Chris Johnson was drafted by the Tennessee Titans in the first round of the 2008 NFL Draft. WWE Chairman and CEO Vince McMahon and his wife Linda McMahon both graduated with a degree in business administration as well. Scott Avett of the folk-rock band The Avett Brothers earned degrees in 1999 and 2000. Henry "Gizmo" Williams, Canadian Football League inductee, graduated from East Carolina University.

Notes

References

External links

 
 ECU Athletics website

 
East Carolina University
Educational institutions established in 1907
Greenville, North Carolina
Education in Pitt County, North Carolina
Universities and colleges accredited by the Southern Association of Colleges and Schools
Public universities and colleges in North Carolina
University of North Carolina
Buildings and structures in Pitt County, North Carolina
1907 establishments in North Carolina